The Artistas Reunidos was a project created in 1997 by the solo artists Jair Oliveira, Wilson Simoninha, Luciana Mello, Max de Castro, Pedro Mariano, and Daniel Carlomagno. It lasted until 1998, when they recorded the album Projeto Artistas Reunidos in São Paulo, Brazil. For a little more than a year, these "artists united" shared the stage with many important Brazilian musicians such as Jair Rodrigues, Djavan, Ed Motta, Sandra de Sá, Vicente Barreto, and many others. The project ended and the 6 artists who started the project each followed their own career and are now popular as solo artists in Música popular brasileira, a term meaning "Brazilian Popular Music".

Brazilian musical groups
Musical groups established in 1997